State Route 256 (SR 256) is a  north–south state highway located in the southern part of the U.S. state of Georgia. Its route is within Colquitt and Worth counties.

Route description

SR 256 begins at an intersection with US 319/SR 35 in Norman Park. It starts heading northwest and immediately curves to the north. Farther to the north, it crosses Warrior Creek. During its curve to the northwest, the route intersects Scooterville Tifton Road, which leads to Tifton. A short while later, SR 256 passes New Prospect Cemetery. It then meets Sumner Road South, which leads to Moultrie and Sumner. Just after this, it intersects Pine Forest Road, which leads to Tempy and Pine Forest cemeteries. It slides across the southwest corner of Poulan. Finally, it turns northwest as it approaches Sylvester, and is co-designated East Martin Luther King Jr. Drive when it enters that city. Approaching Sylvester's Main Street, the co-designated name for SR 33 within the city, SR 256 turns west, and meets its northern terminus at the intersection SR 33 (Main Street). While SR 256 terminates, the Martin Luther King Jr. Drive designation continues as a Sylvester residential street for a further five blocks to the west.

No section of SR 256 is part of the National Highway System.

History
SR 256 was established in 1949 on the same alignment as it runs today. In 1952, the section from Poulan to Sylvester was paved, and, in 1953, the rest of the highway was paved.

Major intersections

See also

References

External links

256
Transportation in Colquitt County, Georgia
Transportation in Worth County, Georgia